The Hood River News was a semi-weekly newspaper published in Hood River, Oregon, United States, from 1905 to 2020. It was published on Wednesdays and Saturdays by Eagle Newspapers and had a circulation of 4,226.

History 
C. P. Sonnichsen and Hugh G. Ball bought the News in 1908. Sonnichsen assumed the role of manager and Ball as editor. By 1912 the newspaper had 1,500 subscribers and transitioned from weekly to semiweekly. 

During his career, Ball headed the Oregon Newspaper Publishers Association and was on the board of directors for the National Editorial Association. The Hood River News, along with The Dalles Chronicle and White Salmon Enterprise, ceased publication on March 31, 2020. They were replaced by the combined Columbia Gorge News on April 8.

Awards

References

External links
Hood River News (official website)

1905 establishments in Oregon
Hood River, Oregon
Newspapers published in Oregon
Oregon Newspaper Publishers Association
Publications established in 1905
Defunct newspapers published in Oregon